The Himachal Pradesh Legislative Assembly is the unicameral legislature of the Indian state of Himachal Pradesh. The seat of the Vidhan Sabha is at Shimla, the capital of the state. The Vidhan Sabha comprises 68 Members of Legislative Assembly, which include 68 members directly elected from single-seat constituency.  Its term is 5 years, unless sooner dissolved.

Members of Himachal Pradesh Legislative Assembly

History 
Himachal Pradesh was the first state in India to launch paperless legislative assembly .

List of assemblies

List of Speakers and Deputy Speakers

List of Speakers

List of Deputy Speakers

List of Leaders of House

List of Leaders of Opposition

See also
Government of Himachal Pradesh
13th Legislative Assembly of Himachal Pradesh

Notes

References

 Himachal Pradesh Election Results

 
Himachal Pradesh
Himachal Pradesh